Nawaz may refer to:

Given name
 Nawaz Haq, Pakistani track and field athlete
 Nawaz Sharif, Former Prime Minister of Pakistan
 Muhammad Nawaz, gold medalist, physician
 Mohammad Nawaz (cricketer), Pakistani cricketer
 Mohammad Nawaz (footballer), Indian footballer

Surname
 Adnan Nawaz, English television presenter
 Amna Nawaz, American broadcast journalist
 Fazrul Nawaz, Singaporean footballer 
 Maajid Nawaz, British-Pakistani political activist 
 Rai Hassan Nawaz, Pakistani politician
 Sana Nawaz, Pakistani film actress and model

Fictional characters
 Alya Nawaz, fictional character from Ackley Bridge
 Farida Nawaz. fictional character from Ackley Bridge
 Riz Nawaz, fictional character from Ackley Bridge
 Sadiq Nawaz, fictional character from Ackley Bridge

Arabic-language surnames
Arabic masculine given names
Pakistani masculine given names